Wu Yiming (born February 11, 1987, in Changchun, Jilin) is a Chinese former competitive pair skater. With partner Dong Huibo, he is the 2008 World Junior bronze medalist. He previously competed with An Ni and was a two-time medalist at the Chinese Figure Skating Championships on the senior level.

Results

References
 2008 Junior Worlds Pairs Results

External links
 
 

1987 births
Living people
Chinese male pair skaters
Figure skaters from Changchun
World Junior Figure Skating Championships medalists
Universiade medalists in figure skating
Universiade silver medalists for China
Universiade bronze medalists for China
Competitors at the 2009 Winter Universiade
Competitors at the 2011 Winter Universiade